Claus Børge Nielsen (born 21 October 1961) is a Danish boxer. He competed in the men's heavyweight event at the 1988 Summer Olympics. At the 1988 Summer Olympics, he lost to Tom Glesby of Canada.

References

External links
 

1961 births
Living people
Danish male boxers
Olympic boxers of Denmark
Boxers at the 1988 Summer Olympics
People from Skive Municipality
Heavyweight boxers
Sportspeople from the Central Denmark Region